Remelia Ringtho (b 21 October 1929) was an Anglican bishop in Uganda.

Ringtho was educated at Buwalasi Theological College and ordained in 1963. He served in the Diocese of Northern Uganda. He was consecrated an Assistant Bishop of Madi-West Nile in 1976, and its Diocesan in 1977. He retired in 1987.

References

Anglican bishops of Madi and West Nile
20th-century Anglican bishops in Uganda
Bulwalasi Theological College alumni